Terminalia canescens, commonly known as joolal, winged nut tree, or wingnut, and also known by its Aboriginal name djilanydjin in north-western Australia, is a tree of the family Combretaceae native to northern parts of Australia.

Description
It blooms between July and January producing white-cream-green flowers. The species is very similar to Terminalia bursarina but has larger leaves and fruits.

The bark is grey to brown in colour and sheds in coarse flakes.

It is found in a variety of habitats over laterite or sandstone in the Kimberley region of Western Australia and the Northern Territory growing in sandy-stony soils.

Uses
The leaves, bark and stems of this plant are used in Australian native tea known as "Jilungin tea". This tea is promoted as aiding relaxation and sleep. The tea is said to have a mild, earthy flavour and aroma, similar to green tea or grass. This tea is used by the Indigenous Nyul Nyul people of the Kimberley in Western Australia to promote deep sleep, and as a digestive tonic to provide energy during the day.

A 2017 report by the Centre for Nutrition and Food Sciences, Queensland Alliance for Agriculture and Food, showed antioxidant levels similar to or exceeding those of green tea in a sample of Terminalia canescens prepared as Jilungun Tea.

Cultivation
A project is under way  to cultivate the tree alongside orchards of gubinge (Terminalia ferdinandiana, aka Kakadu plum) in the Broome area.

References

Trees of Australia
Flora of Western Australia
Flora of the Northern Territory
Plants described in 1888
canescens